Madlena Zepter, also known as Madlena Janković, is a Serbian businesswoman and is married to Philip Zepter, a Serbian businessman. She is the founder and owner of the Madlenianum Opera and Theatre in Belgrade, Serbia, the first privately owned opera and theater company both in Serbia and in south-eastern Europe; the founder of the Zepter Museum in Belgrade, founder of the numerous funds and scholarships, including the Madlena Janković Private Fund. She is also director of the "Madlena Janković – Zepter" Foundation. Her company Madl'Art is the first auction house in Serbia, and she is also owner of the Madl'Or, an export-import company, working exclusively with fine arts.

See also
 Madlenianum Opera and Theatre
 Philip Zepter
 Zepter International

References

External links
 
 Madl'Art Auction House

Year of birth missing (living people)
Living people
Serbian businesspeople
Serbian art collectors
Serbian philanthropists
Serbian women in business
Founders
Women founders